Svay Chek is a khum (commune) of Svay Chek District in Banteay Meanchey Province in north-western Cambodia.

It is the district seat.

Villages

 Kouk Khvav
 Ponsay Cheung
 Kloeng
 Baek Chan Chas
 Ponsay Tboung
 Roka Thmei
 Ta Ong Lech
 Slaeng
 Thmei
 Khvav Lech
 Samraong
 Chamkar Kor
 Damnak Kokos
 Lboek Svay

References

Communes of Banteay Meanchey province
Svay Chek District